Eric Germain (born June 26, 1966 in Quebec City, Quebec) is a retired professional hockey player who played for the Los Angeles Kings in the National Hockey League. As a youth, he played in the 1979 Quebec International Pee-Wee Hockey Tournament with a minor ice hockey team from Sainte-Foy, Quebec City.

Career statistics

References

External links
 

1966 births
Living people
Canadian ice hockey defencemen
Los Angeles Kings players
Undrafted National Hockey League players
Ice hockey people from Quebec City
New England Stingers players
New Jersey Rockin' Rollers players
Saint-Jean Castors players
Fredericton Express players
Flint Spirits players
New Haven Nighthawks players
Binghamton Rangers players
Moncton Hawks players
Richmond Renegades players
Rochester Americans players
Erie Panthers players
New Haven Knights players
Columbus Cottonmouths (CHL) players